Loudwater railway station was a railway station which served Loudwater, Buckinghamshire and Flackwell Heath,  on the Wycombe Railway.

History
Loudwater station was located at the bottom of Treadaway Hill close to the M40 bridge and served both Loudwater and Flackwell Heath. It opened in 1854 and the station became a halt in 1968 because of decreased service on the line. The station was closed and demolished in 1970. The site is now an industrial park, although at the rear of the park the old railway tunnel under the M40 is still in place. A railway conservation path towards High Wycombe follows the route of the former railway.

Routes

In Popular Culture

The station appears briefly in an early scene of The Reptile'' (1966) made by Hammer Film Productions.

References

External links 
 Image of the station site
 The station on a navigable 1946 O. S. map
 Extract from the 1945 OS map showing the line

Disused railway stations in Buckinghamshire
Former Great Western Railway stations
Railway stations in Great Britain opened in 1854
Railway stations in Great Britain closed in 1970